Gitte is a feminine given name which is mostly used in Denmark. It is a reduced version of Birgitte. The name was particularly popular in the 1960s and 1970s. People with the name include:

 Gitte Aaen (born 1981), Danish handball player
 Gitte Andersen (footballer) (born 1977), Danish football player
 Gitte Andersen (handballer) (born 1989), Danish handball player
 Gitte Dæhlin (1956–2012), Norwegian sculptor
 Gitte Haenen (born 1986), Belgian paralympic athlete
 Gitte Hænning (born 1946), Danish singer and film actress
 Gitte Hansen (born 1961), Danish football player
 Gitte Hanspal (born 1982), Danish model
 Gitte Haslebo (born 1943), Danish scientist and author
 Gitte Karlshøj (born 1959), Danish athlete
 Gitte Krogh (born 1977), Danish football player
 Gitte Larsen, Danish curler
 Gitte Lillelund Bech (born 1969), Danish politician
 Gitte Lindstrøm (born 1975), Danish ballet dancer 
 Gitte Madsen [born (1969), Danish handball player
 Gitte Moos Knudsen, Danish neurobiologist and neurologist
 Gitte Pedersen (born 1979), Danish football player
 Gitte Seeberg (born 1960), Danish politician and lawyer
 Gitte Spee (born 1950), Dutch illustrator
 Gitte Sunesen (born 1971), Danish handball player

References

Danish feminine given names